Joseph Cassese House is a historic home located at Scranton, Lackawanna County, Pennsylvania.  It was built about 1910, and is a three-story, five bay wide frame dwelling with an ochre brick veneer in the Italian Renaissance Revival style.  It has a low, hipped terra cotta tile roof.  The front facade features an elaborately carved limestone porch.  Also on the property is a masonry garage with a hipped roof, and contributing retaining walls.  The house was converted to apartments between 1926 and 1933.

It was added to the National Register of Historic Places in 1997.

References

Houses on the National Register of Historic Places in Pennsylvania
Renaissance Revival architecture in Pennsylvania
Houses completed in 1910
Buildings and structures in Scranton, Pennsylvania
Houses in Lackawanna County, Pennsylvania
National Register of Historic Places in Lackawanna County, Pennsylvania